Metalloinvest Management Company LLC is a Russian mining and metallurgy company specializing in the manufacture of steel. It was founded in 1999 and is composed of a mining division (Lebedinsky GOK and Mikhailovsky GOK) and a steel division (Oskol Elektrometallurgical Plant (OEMK) and Ural Steel). USM Holdings Business Development owns 100% of Metalloinvest JSC. Alisher Usmanov is the major beneficiary of USM Holdings (60%), with other major beneficiaries — the companies of Andrei Skoch and Farhad Moshiri — owning 30% and 10%, respectively.

In August 2021 Bloomberg News announced the first IPO of Metalloinvest in 2022 with around 22 billion dollars due diligence.

Related companies and subsidiaries

Investments
Metalloinvest Holding in Moscow
In August 2017, Metalloivest Holding acquired shares in Nautilus Minerals together with Mawarid Offshore Mining.

Mining 
Lebedinsky Mining and Processing Integrated Works/Lebedinsky GOK in Gubkin, Belgorod Oblast; 20% share of domestic iron ore market
Mikhailovsky Mining and Processing Integrated Works/Mikhailovsky GOK in Zheleznogorsk, Kursk Oblast; another 20% share of the domestic iron ore market
Norilsk Nickel: in July 2017 Metalloinvest Cyprus, an indirect subsidiary of Metalloinvest, completed the sale of its 1.79% stake in mining company Norilsk Nickel. The sale raised around $400 million.

Metallurgy 
Ural Steel, based in Novotroitsk, Orenburg Oblast; large Russian integrated steel manufacturer. In 2017 SteelAsia announced an increase in the amount of steel to be purchased from Metalloinvest owned Ural Steel. In February 2022, Metalloinvest announced the sale of 100% of "Ural Steel" to Zagorsky pipe plant.
Oskol Electrometallurgical Integrated Works in Stary Oskol, Belgorod Oblast; large electric steel manufacturer
Oskol Trading Metallurgical Company LLC in Moscow
Moldova Metallurgical Plant (MMP), large electric steel manufacturer
Provider of 1.6 million tons of pellets and 1.8 million tons of iron to Evraz in a partnership deal signed in August 2017

Mechanical engineering
ORMETO – YUMZ Mechanical Engineering Group of Companies in Orsk, Orenburg Oblast; metallurgy, mining and energy engineering; industrial equipment manufacture

Distribution and other
Metalloinvesttrans, transport, rail transport, sea terminals
OJSC Tulachermet

HoReCa
 Safisa, restaurant

Competition
Domestic competitors include Evraz Group and Novolipetsk Steel.

See also

 List of steel producers

References

External links
Metalloinvest 

Steel companies of Russia
Mining companies of Russia
Companies based in Moscow
Russian brands